Peter "Madcat" Ruth (aka "Madcat" Ruth, or Peter Ruth) is an American Grammy Award-winning virtuoso harmonica player, who lives in Ann Arbor, Michigan, United States. He has been an invited guest performer at many harmonica festivals and workshops in North America, South America, Europe and Asia, and has performed with symphony orchestras, as well as on radio and television advertisements and appearances all over the world. His harmonica playing can be heard on over 130 CD's and LP's, a well as instructional DVD's.

Biography

Early life
Peter McCord Ruth was born in Evanston, Illinois, US in 1949. He attended elementary school at Carpenter School in Park Ridge, Illinois, and graduated from Maine South High School in 1967. He became inspired to play the blues when he heard a Sonny Terry and Brownie McGhee record. He grew up listening to Chicago blues musicians, and he often visited Maxwell Street, and attended many shows at the Regal Theater in Chicago, as well as the University of Chicago to see artists such as James Brown, Junior Walker and the All Stars, Otis Redding, Mississippi John Hurt, Mississippi Fred McDowell, Big Joe Williams, Sleepy John Estes, Yank Rachell, Robert Pete Williams, and many others, who would become a big influence on him and his music.

In 1963, when he was a freshman in high school, he took guitar lessons at the Old Town School of Folk Music in Chicago, and at the age of 14 began playing folk/blues on guitar and harmonica around the Chicago area in his first band, a duo called The Petey-Tweety Band. At age 18, Ruth began taking harmonica lessons from Big Walter Horton.

Musical career

1960s
In 1968 he met bassist and trombonist Chris Brubeck, son of jazz pianist Dave Brubeck, at a jam session, and Madcat told Chris to let him know if he ever needed a harmonica player. In the spring of 1969, Chris Brubeck invited Madcat to join his rock band, New Heavenly Blue, who were located in Michigan. For the next two years, Madcat played with the band during summers and on weekends while attending Lake Forest College in Illinois.

1970s
In 1971, Ruth relocated to Ann Arbor to work full-time with New Heavenly Blue, and they recorded two albums, one for RCA Victor and another for Atlantic Records.

In 1971, Dave Brubeck wrote the cantata "Truth is Fallen", which featured New Heavenly Blue, and was performed with various orchestras, among them the Rochester Philharmonic, the Cincinnati Symphony Orchestra, and the Dallas Symphony Orchestra. New Heavenly Blue also played the music for a touring company performing Jesus Christ Superstar, with Madcat playing all of the saxophone parts on the harmonica.

When New Heavenly Blue disbanded in 1973, Madcat joined the Darius Brubeck Ensemble, a progressive jazz group led by Chris's older brother, Darius. The group was often billed as opening act for the Dave Brubeck Quartet, and at these concerts Madcat was performing with such jazz greats as Gerry Mulligan and Paul Desmond, as well as Dave Brubeck.

In 1974 when the Dave Brubeck Quartet disbanded, Dave invited Madcat to join his new group Two Generations of Brubeck, which featured Dave, and his sons Darius, Chris, and Daniel, as well as clarinetist Perry Robinson and percussionist Muruga Booker. Madcat performed with the band for the next few years, at many high-profile concerts, including an appearance at Carnegie Hall in New York City, on July 2, 1975, at the Newport Jazz Festival.

In 1974, Madcat also joined Chris Brubeck's newly formed progressive rock group, Sky King. In 1975, Sky King released the album Secret Sauce, on Columbia Records, and made an extensive U.S. tour.

1980s
In the 1980s, Madcat went solo and began infusing the folk/blues tradition with elements of funk, rock and jazz, recording with the country rock band Blackfoot and Word Jazz vocalist Ken Nordine, as well as a wide variety of other artists. In 1987, Madcat recorded an album with Rock & Roll Hall of Fame inductee and Parliament-Funkadelic bassist Bootsy Collins.

In 1981, Madcat began a longtime association with twin brothers Sandor & Lazlo Slomovits and their band Gemini, performing music written mostly for children and families, and the resulting recordings have won a number of honors, including awards from Parents' Choice Magazine, the American Library Association, the National Parenting Publications (NAPPA), Early Childhood News, and the Wolf Trap Institute for Early Learning Through the Arts.

1990s
In 1990, Madcat and guitarist/singer Shari Kane formed the duo Madcat & Kane. They continued to record and tour nationally and internationally until 2014. In the 1990s, Madcat Ruth also recorded with W.C. Handy Award winner Rory Block, as well as blues guitarist Catfish Keith, and folk singer Rosalie Sorrels.

In 1997 Madcat was named "Harmonica Player of the Year" by the Society for the Preservation and Advancement of the Harmonica (SPAH).

In 1998 Madcat teamed up with Chris Brubeck, and guitarist Joel Brown, to form Chris Brubeck's Triple Play, a band that he continues to perform with. That same year, he also started performing with Big Joe Manfra in Brazil, and he has completer thirteen tours in Brazil with Manfra since then.

2000s
Ruth also recorded with George Clinton, and he appeared on the 2003 compilation 6 Degrees of P-Funk: The Best of George Clinton & His Funky Family.

In 2005, Homespun Tapes released two DVDs of harmonica techniques taught by Madcat, "Anyone Can Play Harmonica – An Easy Guide to Getting Started", and "The Ins And Outs of Rhythm Harp – Percussive Techniques for Blues Players".

In February 2006 he won the Grammy Award for "Best Classical Recording", for his performance on William Bolcom's Songs of Innocence and of Experience, recorded live at Hill Auditorium at the University of Michigan.

In 2009, Madcat was one of the featured musicians in the documentary film Pocket Full of Soul: The Harmonica Documentary, which was narrated by Huey Lewis.

2010s
In 2014, Madcat appeared on Musician/Actor Jeff Daniels recording Days Like These.

In 2017, in honor of John Lee Hooker's 100th birthday anniversary celebration, he performed with Booker Blues All-Stars on a recording called Booker Plays Hooker. The band consists of drummer Muruga Booker, Rock and Roll Hall of Fame inductee Billy Davis (guitar & vocals), Tony "Strat" Thomas (guitar), John Sauter (bass guitar), and Misty Love (former backup singer for Kid Rock) (vocals)

Although he is always involved in many side projects and special guest appearances, Madcat currently plays with Peter Madcat Ruth's C.A.R.Ma. Quartet, with Chris Brubeck's Triple Play, and with The Schrock Brothers Band.

Equipment
Seydel Noble Harmonicas (with stainless steel reeds)
Shaker / Madcat harmonica microphone
Samson Airlines, AG1 wireless transmitter/ AP1 receiver
MXR 10 band Graphic EQ (customized by Elevon Audio to make it quieter)
Fairfield Circuitry Barbershop Overdrive
Electro-Harmonix Micro POG Polyphonic Octave Generator
Jim Dunlop Way Huge Supa-Puss Analog Delay
Peavey Transformer 112 guitar amp
The Amptweaker TightDrive Jr

Selected Discography

1970 – New Heavenly Blue – Educated Homegrown
1971 – Dave Brubeck – Truth
1972 – Dave Brubeck – Truth Is Fallen
1972 – New Heavenly Blue – New Heavenly Blue
1973 – Dave Brubeck – Two Generations of Brubeck
1974 – Dave Brubeck – Brother, the Great Spirit Made Us All
1975 – Sky King – Secret Sauce
1977 – Bob White – Bob White
1978 – Mike Smith – Mike Smith and the Country Volunteers	
1978 – Rosalie Sorrels – Traveling Lady Rides Again
1979– Ken Nordine – Stare With Your Ears
1980 – Blackfoot – Tomcattin'
1982 – Gemini – Good Mischief
1984 – Peter Madcat Ruth – Madcat Gone Solo
1986 – Ken Nordine – Grandson of Word Jazz
1987 – Micro Wave and Bootsy Collins – Cookin' From The Inside Out!!!
1989 – Madcat's Pressure Cooker – Live at The Pig
1991 – Rory Block – Mama's Blues
1992 – Madcat & Kane – Key To the Highway
1992 – Bill Crofut & Chris Brubeck – Red White & Blues
1993 – Rosalie Sorrels – Travelin' Lady Rides Again
1994 – Peter Madcat Ruth – Harmonicology
1995 – Robin & Linda Williams – Good News
1998 – David Menefee – Brighter Side of Blue
1998 – Chris Buhalis – Kenai Dreams
1999 – Madcat & Kane – Up Against The Wall
1999 – Chris Brubeck's Triple Play – Triple Play Live
2000 – Madcat & The Cats – Live at the Ark
2001 – Muruga GVCB – God Bless America
2001 – Laz Slomovits – Harbor of the Heart
2002 – Muruga GVCB – One Global Village
2003 – Chris Brubeck's Triple Play – Watching The World
2003 – Mustards Retreat – A Resolution of Something
2003 – George Clinton – Six Degrees of P-Funk: The Best of George Clinton & His Funky Family
2004 – William Bolcom – Songs of Innocence and of Experience
2004 – Rosalie Sorrels – My Last Go Round
2005 – Peter Madcat Ruth – Live In Rio
2006 – Peter Madcat Ruth – Harmonica & Ukulele Project
2008 – Rosalie Sorrels – Strangers in Another Country
2008 – Dave Brubeck – Only the Best of Dave Brubeck
2008 – Peter Madcat Ruth – More Real Folk Blues
2009 – Madcat, Kane & Maxwell Street – Live at the Creole Gallery
2010 – Katie Geddes – We Are Each Other's Angels
2011 – Booker, Dansby, Sauter & Love – The Hand I Was Dealt
2012 – Dave Boutette – Mending Time
2012 – Chris Brubeck's Triple Play – Live at Zankel Music Center
2013 – Muruga & The Cosmic Hoedown Band – Changing The Sound of Your Room
2014 – Jeff Daniels – Days Like These
2014 – The Madcat Midnight Blues Journey – Live at Salt of the Earth
2017 – Booker Blues All-Stars – Booker Plays Hooker

Filmography
2005 – Anyone Can Play Harmonica – An Easy Guide to Getting Started
2005 – The Ins And Outs of Rhythm Harp – Percussive Techniques for Blues Players
2009 – Pocket Full of Soul: The Harmonica Documentary

Awards
1997 – "Harmonica Player of the Year" by the Society for the Preservation and Advancement of the Harmonica (SPAH).
2006 – Grammy Award for "Best Classical Recording", for William Bolcom's Songs of Innocence and of Experience

References

External links
 Official Website
 YouTube channel
 Madcat on CDBaby

1949 births
Living people
American folk singers
American blues guitarists
American male guitarists
Blues revival musicians
American blues singer-songwriters
Country blues musicians
Country blues singers
People from Cook County, Illinois
People from Ann Arbor, Michigan
Songster musicians
20th-century American singers
21st-century American singers
20th-century American guitarists
21st-century American guitarists
Singer-songwriters from Illinois
Guitarists from Michigan
Guitarists from Illinois
American blues harmonica players
Jazz harmonica players
Latin jazz harmonica players
Old Town School of Folk musicians
20th-century American male singers
21st-century American male singers
American male jazz musicians
American male singer-songwriters
Singer-songwriters from Michigan